Equatoguinean Futsal Championship is the premier futsal league in Equatorial Guinea. The competition is run by the Liga Fútbol Sala de Guinea Ecuatorial under the auspices of the Equatoguinean Football Federation.

List of champions

 2014–15: Atletico Los Angeles
 2015–16: Atletico Los Angeles
 2016–17: Atletico Los Angeles
 2017–18: Atletico Los Angeles
 2018–19:

See also
Equatoguinean Futsal Cup

References

External links
Official website

Futsal competitions in Equatorial Guinea
futsal
2014 establishments in Equatorial Guinea
Equatorial Guinea
Sports leagues established in 2014